Rony Dwig Revollar Miranda (born 26 February 1976) is a Peruvian football manager and former player who played as a defender.

Playing career
Born Lima, Revollar represented Alianza Lima and Sport Boys as a youth.  He made his senior debut in 1996 with Segunda División side Hijos de Yurimaguas, and represented fellow league team Bella Esperanza in the following year.

In 1999, Revollar played in the Copa Perú with Alfonso Ugarte de Puno. After another year in the second division with Telefunken 20, he made his Primera División debut in 2001 with Deportivo Wanka.

Revollar would subsequently resume his career in the lower levels, representing Las Torres de Limatambo, San Francisco de Borja and Deport San Borja. He retired with the latter in 2004, aged 28.

Managerial career
After starting his career in the lower leagues, mainly associated to the clubs he represented as a player, Revollar joined Alianza Universidad in February 2016, as a youth coordinator. He was the assistant manager for the 2017 season, and was named manager for the 2018 campaign.

Revollar finished as runners-up in the Copa Perú with Alianza for the 2018, and achieved promotion to the top tier in the play-offs.

References

External links

1976 births
Living people
Footballers from Lima
Peruvian footballers
Association football defenders
Peruvian Primera División players
Peruvian Segunda División players
Alfonso Ugarte de Puno players
Sport Coopsol Trujillo footballers
Peruvian football managers
Peruvian Primera División managers